Departure at Seven (Italian: Partenza ore 7) is a 1946 Italian musical comedy film directed by Mario Mattoli and starring Chiaretta Gelli, Carlo Campanini and Laura Gore. The film's sets were designed by the art director Gastone Medin. It was shot at the Fert Studios in Turin.

Cast
 Chiaretta Gelli as Chiaretta Fumagalli
 Carlo Campanini as Se stesso
 Alberto Rabagliati as Giorgio
 Laura Gore as Lucy D'Orsay
 Tino Scotti as Filippo
 Enzo Turco as Nicolino
 Nando Bruno as Brunetti
 Raimondo Vianello as Spettatore a teatro
 Maria Donati
 Paolo Bonecchi
 Egisto Olivieri
 Dino Peretti
 Galeazzo Benti

References

Bibliography
 Carlo Celli & Marga Cottino-Jones. A New Guide to Italian Cinema. Springer, 2007.

External links

1946 films
1940s Italian-language films
Italian black-and-white films
Films directed by Mario Mattoli
Lux Film films
Italian musical comedy films
1946 musical comedy films
1940s Italian films